Cyperus camphoratus is a species of sedge that is native to parts of Mexico, Central America and northern South America.

See also 
 List of Cyperus species

References 

camphoratus
Plants described in 1850
Flora of Mexico
Flora of Brazil
Flora of Colombia
Flora of Bolivia
Flora of Costa Rica
Flora of Honduras
Flora of Paraguay
Flora of Nicaragua
Flora of Venezuela